Red Blanket Creek is a stream in the U.S. state of Oregon.  It is a tributary to Middle Fork Rogue River.

Red Blanket Creek was named for an operation in which pioneers bartered red blankets for land.

References

Rivers of Oregon
Rivers of Jackson County, Oregon
Rivers of Klamath County, Oregon